were the most common of war banners used on the medieval Japanese battlefield. The term can be translated to literally mean symbol flag, marker banner, or the like. Unlike the later nobori, which were stiffened, these banners were simple streamers attached to a shaft by a horizontal cross-piece. Later, some hata-jirushi were hemmed on the sides to create a sleeve for a pole on the side and top, or had pieces of fabric attaching their side and top to poles to make the banners visible from the front. There are two variants of the Hata-jirushi: One end of the cross-piece was attached to the shaft or the cross-piece was suspended from the shaft, similar to the Vexillum.

Hata-jirushi served much the same purpose as the nobori, which replaced them, identifying and distinguishing regiments or sections of an army.

Gallery

Sources

References

Turnbull, Stephen (1998). The Samurai Sourcebook. London: Cassell & Co.

External links
 Guns Scrolls and Swords exhibit at the Harold B. Lee Library, includes full text PDFs of Hata Uma–Jirushi Ezu
 Seiki shuzu, manuscript illustrating hata and uma-jirushi

Military communication in feudal Japan
Japanese heraldry
Samurai weapons and equipment

ja:馬印